K. T. Balasubramaniem (born 18 August 1966) is an Indian cinematographer. Under the tutelage of P. C. Sreeram for nearly 5 years, he worked in award-winning films such as Thevar Magan, Thiruda Thiruda and Kuruthipunal.

Career
His debut film was Iraniyan, a historical film set in the Pre-Independence era. Later, he worked in director Bala's film Pithamagan and 180.

Balasubramaniem started his career by assisting noted-cinematographer, P. C. Sreeram, for nearly 5 years, in award-winning films like Thevar Magan (1992), Thiruda Thiruda (1993), and Kuruthipunal (1995).

Filmography

References

External links
 

Living people
Telugu film cinematographers
Cinematographers from Tamil Nadu
People from Sivaganga district
1966 births